The 2000 Windsor and Maidenhead Borough Council election took place on 4 May 2000 to elect members of Windsor and Maidenhead Unitary Council in Berkshire, England. The whole council was up for election and the Liberal Democrats lost overall control of the council to no overall control.

Election result
The election saw a trial of mobile polling stations in an attempt to increase turnout.

References

2000 English local elections
2000
2000s in Berkshire